"My Moment" is a song by American hip hop artist DJ Drama, released June 29, 2012, as the second single from his fourth studio album Quality Street Music (2012). The song, produced by record producer T-Minus, features American rappers 2 Chainz, Meek Mill and R&B singer-songwriter Jeremih.

Music video
The music video was shot at OVO Fest, in Toronto, on August 6, 2012. DJ Drama gathered the song's featured artists and also released behind-the-scenes pictures of the video shoot via his Instagram account. The music Video premiered on MTV Jams on September 9, 2012. The video features cameos from all guest on the track (2 Chainz, Jeremih, and Meek Mill) along with appearances from ASAP Rocky, Drake, and Waka Flocka Flame.

Chart performance
The song first charted on the week of July 23, 2012, debuting at No. 92 on the Billboard Hot R&B/Hip-Hop Songs. On its second week on the chart, the song climbed to No. 87. On its fourth week the song climbed to No. 76 and has peaked at No. 23. On the week of October 18, the song debuted on the Hot 100 at No. 99. It has since peaked at No. 89, becoming DJ Drama's second most successful single to date, behind "Wishing" in 2016.

Charts

Release history

References

2012 singles
2012 songs
DJ Drama songs
Meek Mill songs
Jeremih songs
2 Chainz songs
Songs written by 2 Chainz
Song recordings produced by T-Minus (record producer)
Songs written by Jeremih
Songs written by T-Minus (record producer)
Songs written by Meek Mill
MNRK Music Group singles